Shian (also Romanized as Shīān and Sheyān; also known as Bala yi Shiān, Balūshīān and Shīlān) is a village in Zhavarud-e Sharqi Rural District, in the Central District of Sanandaj County, Kurdistan Province, Iran. At the 2006 census, its population was 834, in 201 families. The village is populated by Kurds.

References 

Towns and villages in Sanandaj County
Kurdish settlements in Kurdistan Province